Caroline Georgiana ("Caro") Fraser (1953-2020) was a British novelist, and the daughter of writer George MacDonald Fraser, author of The Flashman Papers books.

Fraser was born in Carlisle in 1953, but her family moved to Glasgow shortly afterwards and she was brought up there until her mid-teens, attending Glasgow High School for Girls. When she was 15 her father published the first book in the Flashman series, and the family subsequently moved to the Isle of Man, where she went to The Buchan School. She started writing professionally in 1992, but before that she was a commercial and maritime lawyer, and before that an advertising copywriter. 

She died 20 April 2020.

Publications

Caper Court series
The Pupil (1992)
Judicial Whispers (1995)
An Immoral Code (1997)
A Hallowed Place (1999)
A Perfect Obsession (2002)
A Calculating Heart (2004)
Breath of Corruption (2007)
Errors of Judgment (2013)
A Touch of Silk (2020)

The Haddon Chronicles
The Summer House Party (2017)

Other novels
She also wrote eight stand-alone novels, which she described on her web site as romantic fiction for the thinking woman.
The Trustees (1994)
An Inheritance (1996)
Beyond Forgiveness (1998)
A Little Learning (2001)
Familiar Rooms in Darkness (2003)
A World Apart (2006)
Summer of Love (2018)

References

External links
Caro Fraser's web site

1953 births
2020 deaths
20th-century British novelists
21st-century British novelists
People educated at the High School of Glasgow